Jaracz  is a village in the administrative district of Gmina Rogoźno, within Oborniki County, Greater Poland Voivodeship, in west-central Poland.

Jaracz is the site of a Museum of Milling and Water Equipment, under the auspices of the National Museum of Agriculture in Szreniawa.

References

Jaracz